The Big East Conference Men's Basketball Coach of the Year award is given to the men's basketball coach in the Big East Conference voted as the best. It was first awarded at the end of the 1979–80 season, the inaugural season of the Big East.

Key

Winners

See also 
 Big East Conference (1979–2013)
 Big East men's basketball tournament
 Associated Press College Basketball Coach of the Year
 Henry Iba Award
 NABC Coach of the Year
 Naismith College Coach of the Year

References 

Coach of the Year
NCAA Division I men's basketball conference coaches of the year
Awards established in 1980